Goeminne is a Belgian surname. Notable people with the surname include:

Christiane Goeminne, Belgian cyclist
Paul Goeminne (1888–?), Belgian ice hockey player

Surnames of Belgian origin